The doubleband surgeonfish or lieutenant tang (Acanthurus tennenti), is a marine ray-finned fish in the family Acanthuridae.

Description
The colour is variable, the sexes being similar except in the breeding season, when the mature male takes on a distinctive appearance. This fish is usually orange-beige, olive-tan or steely grey, but can turn a dark brown shade flushed with red or purple when stressed. A dark line runs along the base of the dorsal fin with a similar line at the base of the anal fin. There are two dark streaks behind the eye, and the scalpel-like scales that project from the caudal peduncle are blackish and surrounded by a large black spot with a bluish border. Both dorsal and anal fins are long, extending as far as the caudal peduncle. The caudal fin is crescent-shaped, the points growing longer as the fish ages. It is rimmed by a band of bluish-white.

Distribution and habitat
This species has a wide distribution across the tropical and subtropical Indo-Pacific region; its range extends from East Africa and Madagascar to southern India, Sri Lanka, Malaysia, Thailand and Indonesia.

Ecology
The doubleband surgeonfish feeds on algae growing on the seabed and detritus, as well as the algal film that grows on sand and other substrates. Breeding involves the liberation of sperm and eggs into the sea. The larvae are pelagic, and return to the reef habitat about seven weeks later. The juveniles form mixed species groups with other fish species; at first they may be black, or yellow with a black eye ring, but later they resemble the adult fish, apart from the black markings behind the eye, which at one stage in juvenile development is horseshoe-shaped. This fish feeds in the open during the day, often in small groups with parrotfish and other species.

Status
This is a common fish in much of its range. It is sometimes caught for human consumption and for use in the aquarium trade. It is susceptible to the destruction of the reef habitats in which it lives, but is found in several marine protected areas. The International Union for Conservation of Nature has rated its conservation status as being of "least concern".

References

External links
 

doubleband surgeonfish
Fish of the Indian Ocean
Fish of the Pacific Ocean
doubleband surgeonfish
Taxa named by Albert Günther
Taxobox binomials not recognized by IUCN